Angela Yevgenyevna Tuvaeva (born September 20, 1985, in Moscow, USSR) is a Russian curler, a , a 2006 European mixed bronze medallist and a six-time Russian women's champion (2001, 2002, 2003, 2004, 2005, 2007).

She participated at the 2002 Winter Olympics, where the Russian team finished in tenth place.

Also she is a former basketball player and a streetball player.

Teams

Women's

Mixed

References

External links

 Анжела Тюваева | Спортивная Россия

Living people
1985 births
Basketball players from Moscow
Russian female curlers
Olympic curlers of Russia
Curlers at the 2002 Winter Olympics
Russian curling champions
Russian women's basketball players
Street basketball players
21st-century Russian women